Canusio Lake is a freshwater body in the northeastern part of Senneterre in the La Vallée-de-l'Or Regional County Municipality (RCM), in the administrative region of Abitibi-Témiscamingue, in the province of Quebec, in Canada.

Canusio Lake is located in the township of Noiseux, Logan and Cherrier. Forestry is the main economic activity of the sector. Recreational tourism activities come second.

The hydrographic slope of Canusio Lake is accessible via a forest road (North-South direction) on the east side of the Saint-Cyr River Valley; in addition, another forest road (East-West direction) serves the South of the Mégiscane River.

The surface of Canusio Lake is usually frozen from early November to mid-May, however, safe ice circulation is generally from mid-November to mid-April.

Geography

Toponymy
Formerly, this body of water was designated "Lake Matciskan".

The toponym "Lac Canusio" was formalized on December 5, 1968, by the Commission de toponymie du Québec, when it was created.

Notes and references

See also 

Lakes of Abitibi-Témiscamingue
Nottaway River drainage basin